Manjot Sandhu (born August 19, 1990) is a Canadian wrestler. He finished in 18th place in the 96kg event at the 2013 World Wrestling Championships. He won a bronze medal in the 84 kg freestyle at the Commonwealth Wrestling Championship in Jalandhar 2009.

References 

Canadian male sport wrestlers
Living people
1990 births